Lieutenant General N. S. Raja Subramani AVSM, SM, VSM is a serving general officer of the Indian Army. He currently serves as the General Officer Commanding-in-Chief Central Command. He earlier served as the Chief of Staff of the Northern Command.

Early life and education
Subramani attended the National Defence Academy, as part of the 67th course. He then was part of the 77th course of the Indian Military Academy.

Military career
Subramani was commissioned into the 8th battalion, The Garhwal Rifles (8 Garh RIF) in December 1985. Early in his career, he served as a Divisional officer at his alma-mater - the National Defence Academy. He attended the Joint Services Command and Staff College in Bracknell, UK. After completing the course, he returned to India and was appointed Brigade major of a mountain brigade.

Subramani commanded the 16th battalion, The Garhwal Rifles (16 Garh RIF) in Assam. The battalion was deployed in a counter-insurgency role as part of Operation Rhino. For his command of 16 Garh Rif, he was awarded the Sena Medal for devotion to duty. He subsequently was appointed the Defence attaché at the Embassy of India in Astana, Kazakhstan. In the rank of Colonel, he also served as the Assistant Military Secretary in the MS branch at Army headquarters. He later served as the Colonel General Staff (Operations) at Headquarters Eastern Command. In Jammu and Kashmir, he served as the Deputy Commander of a Rashtriya Rifles sector.

Promoted to the rank of Brigadier, Subramani commanded the 168 Infantry Brigade in Samba. On 26 January 2015, he was awarded the Vishisht Seva Medal. He was then selected to attend the National Defence College in New Delhi, as part of the 55th course. After the course, he was appointed Deputy Director General Military Intelligence (DDGMI) at Army HQ. He subsequently served as the Brigadier General Staff (Operations) in the Eastern Command.

General officer
Subramani was promoted to the rank of Major General and appointed General officer commanding 17th Mountain Division in Sikkim. He then moved to the Defence Services Staff College, Wellington as the Chief Instructor (Army). On 26 January 2020, he was awarded the Ati Vishisht Seva Medal. On 3 February 2020, he was promoted to the rank of Lieutenant General and appointed General officer commanding Uttar Bharat Area.

On 12 February 2021, Subramani took command of one of the strike corps of the Army - II Corps. He took over from Lieutenant General Surinder Singh Mahal. After a year-long tenure, he moved to the Northern Command in Udhampur as the Chief of Staff, taking over in May 2022.

In March 2023, Subramani succeeded Lieutenant General Yogendra Dimri as General Officer Commanding-in-Chief Central Command, who  superannuated on 28 February 2023.

Awards and decorations
Subramani was awarded the Sena Medal in 2005, the Vishisht Seva Medal in 2015 and the Ati Vishisht Seva Medal in 2020.

Dates of rank

References

Living people
Indian generals
Indian Army officers
Recipients of the Ati Vishisht Seva Medal
Recipients of the Sena Medal
Recipients of the Vishisht Seva Medal
National Defence Academy (India) alumni
Graduates of Joint Services Command and Staff College
National Defence College, India alumni
Indian military attachés
Academic staff of the Defence Services Staff College
Year of birth missing (living people)